The Dean of Birmingham is the senior member of clergy responsible for St. Philip's Cathedral in Birmingham, England. Before 2000 the post was designated provost, which was the equivalent of a dean but used in the case of pro-cathedrals, such as Birmingham, which had originally been built as parish churches.


List of provosts and deans

Provosts
1931–1937 Hamilton Baynes
1937–1949 Harold Richards
1951–1962 Michael Clarke
1962–1972 George Sinker
1972–1986 Basil Moss
1986–2000 Peter Berry
2000– Gordon Mursell (became Dean)

Deans
2002/3–2005 Gordon Mursell (previously Provost)
2006–2009 Robert Wilkes
2010–2017 Catherine Ogle (installed and inducted in September 2010)
30 September 2017present Matt Thompson

See also
Provost (religion)

Notes

References

Whitaker's Almanack various editions from 1917 to 2004, Joseph Whitaker & Sons

Anglican ecclesiastical offices
 
Lists of English people
Anglican Diocese of Birmingham